The Portuguese Revolution may refer to
The Liberal Revolution of 1820
The April Revolt
The Revolution of Maria da Fonte
The 5 October 1910 revolution
The 28 May 1926 coup d'état
The Carnation Revolution